North Street Historic District is a national historic district located at New Martinsville, Wetzel County, West Virginia. It encompasses 23 contributing buildings that include a residential and commercial area of New Martinsville. Most of the buildings in the district date to the late-19th and early-20th century in popular architectural styles, such as Stick Style, Queen Anne, and American Foursquare.  Notable buildings include the Old Hospital Building (c. 1890), New Martinsville Grocery Company and warehouse (1895), former Cottage Hotel (1890), and the Moose Club (c. 1915).

It was listed on the National Register of Historic Places in 1988.

References

National Register of Historic Places in Wetzel County, West Virginia
Historic districts in Wetzel County, West Virginia
Queen Anne architecture in West Virginia
Buildings and structures in Wetzel County, West Virginia
Stick-Eastlake architecture in West Virginia
American Foursquare architecture in West Virginia
Historic districts on the National Register of Historic Places in West Virginia